The Charles Robinson House is located in Greenbush, Wisconsin, United States. It was added to the National Register of Historic Places in 1984.

References

Greek Revival houses in Wisconsin
Houses in Sheboygan County, Wisconsin
Houses on the National Register of Historic Places in Wisconsin
National Register of Historic Places in Sheboygan County, Wisconsin